The  Pirate Party Romania is a political party in Romania based on the Swedish Pirate Party.  The party is a member of the international Pirate Party movement and is focused on copyright and patent reform, internet freedom, and government transparency.

The website of the Romanian Pirate Party was launched on 9 June 2009, and the first online meeting was held on 19 July 2009. The same year, on 6 August, members held their first live meeting, while one month later, on 7 September, the first article regarding the party was published in the Romanian online media.

Party registration

In preparation for the official registration the party statute was approved by the founding members, and the first elected board was composed of Cristian Bulumac (President), Ştefan Marius Angelescu (Vice-President), Claudiu Marginean (Founding President), Ștefan Cristian Brîndușă (General Secretary) until March 2020, with a few exceptions.

On 11 February 2014 the party has submitted to the authorities the official request to be legally registered as a political party without the required signatures of 25,000 founding members.

In February 2015, the Pirate Party, among others, contested the electoral law at the Constitutional Court of Romania, arguing that the law violates freedom of association, the Constitutional Court heard the case of the Pirate Party leaders and admitted their contestation, overturning the section of the electoral law mandating the number of founding members.

External links
 Partidul Pirat Romania official website 
 Blog of Partidul Pirat Romania

References

Romania
Liberal parties in Romania
2009 establishments in Romania
Political parties established in 2009